Susanna "Susan" Kohner (born November 11, 1936) is an American retired actress who worked in film and television. She played Sarah Jane in Imitation of Life (1959), for which she was nominated for an Oscar and won a Golden Globe award.

After Kohner married menswear designer and writer John Weitz in 1964, she retired from acting to devote time to her family. Her two sons, Paul Weitz and Chris Weitz, have both become film directors and producers, screenwriters, and occasional actors.

Early life
Kohner was born in Los Angeles, California, the daughter of Lupita Tovar, a Mexican-born actress who had a career in Hollywood, and Paul Kohner, a film producer who was born in Bohemia, Austria-Hungary. Her mother was Roman Catholic, and of both Mexican and Irish descent, and her father was Jewish.

Career
Most of Kohner's film roles came during the late 1950's and early 1960's, including co-starring with Sal Mineo in both Dino (1957) and The Gene Krupa Story (1959).

In her best known role, Kohner played Sarah Jane in Imitation of Life, portraying a light-skinned black woman who "passes" as white. The 1959 film was a remake of a 1934 version of a book of the same name. The expensive, glossy Ross Hunter production, directed by Douglas Sirk and starring Lana Turner, was a box-office hit. In addition, Kohner was nominated for a Best Supporting Actress Academy Award for her role in the film, and won a Golden Globe as Best Supporting Actress and one as Best New Actress.

Following her role in Imitation of Life, Kohner appeared in All the Fine Young Cannibals opposite Natalie Wood and Robert Wagner. She later had guest roles on various television series, including  Hong Kong, Going My Way, and Temple Houston. She made her last film appearance in 1962, costarring with Montgomery Clift in Freud: The Secret Passion. She retired from acting in 1964.

Personal life
In 1964, Kohner married John Weitz, a German-born novelist and fashion designer. She retired from acting to devote time to her family. The couple had two sons together, Chris and Paul Weitz, who both became film directors and producers in Hollywood, together producing films such as American Pie (1999) and About a Boy (2002). Chris Weitz is also known for directing New Moon (2009), part of The Twilight Saga.

On April 23, 2010, a new print of Imitation of Life (1959) was screened at the TCM Film Festival in Los Angeles, California, to which Kohner and co-star Juanita Moore were invited.  After the screening, the two women appeared on stage for a question-and-answer session hosted by TCM's Robert Osborne. Kohner and Moore received standing ovations.

Theater
 1958: Love Me Little by John G. Fuller at Helen Hayes Theatre. Role: Emily Whittaker. Broadway debut.
 1962: Pullman Car Hiawatha by Thornton Wilder at Circle in the Square Theatre. Role: Harriet Milbury.
 1963: Saint Joan by George Bernard Shaw at Vancouver Theater Festival. With Mike Nichols.

Filmography

Awards and nominations

See also
 John Weitz
 Chris Weitz
 Paul Weitz
 Lupita Tovar
 Paul Kohner

References

External links

 
 
 
 

1936 births
Living people
20th-century American actresses
Actresses from Los Angeles
American actresses of Mexican descent
American film actresses
American people of Czech-Jewish descent
American people of Irish descent
American television actresses
Best Supporting Actress Golden Globe (film) winners
Jewish American actresses
Kohner family
New Star of the Year (Actress) Golden Globe winners
21st-century American Jews
21st-century American women